Ebrima Ebou Sillah (born 12 April 1980) is a Gambian former professional footballer who played as a winger or striker.

Club career
Ebou Sillah was born in Bakau. He played for Real Banjul, Blankenberge, Club Brugge, Harelbeke, RBC Roosendaal, Rubin Kazan, FC Brussels, Hapoel Petah Tikva and MVV.

Personal life
He also holds a Belgian passport.

Honours
Club Brugge
Belgian Cup: 2001–02
Belgian Super Cup: 2002

References

External links
 

Living people
1980 births
People from Bakau
Black Belgian sportspeople
Belgian people of Gambian descent
Belgian sportspeople of African descent
The Gambia international footballers
Association football forwards
Real de Banjul FC players
Club Brugge KV players
K.R.C. Zuid-West-Vlaanderen players
RBC Roosendaal players
FC Rubin Kazan players
R.W.D.M. Brussels F.C. players
Hapoel Petah Tikva F.C. players
MVV Maastricht players
Belgian Pro League players
Eerste Divisie players
Russian Premier League players
Gambian expatriate footballers
Gambian footballers
Gambian expatriate sportspeople in Belgium
Expatriate footballers in Belgium
Gambian expatriate sportspeople in Russia
Expatriate footballers in Russia
Gambian expatriate sportspeople in the Netherlands
Expatriate footballers in the Netherlands
Gambian expatriate sportspeople in Israel
Expatriate footballers in Israel